Sir Thomas Alexander Vans Best,  (8 October 1870 – 24 November 1941) was a British colonial administrator.

He was born the son of Dr Alexander Vans Best of Aberdeen, previously a Staff Surgeon in the Bengal Army.

Thomas Vans Best joined the Colonial Service and served as Acting Governor of the Leeward Islands on behalf of Sir Edward Marsh Merewether from 1916 to 1919 and as Colonial Secretary of Trinidad and Tobago from August, 1919.

He was Lieutenant Governor of Malta from 1925 to 1930 and Governor of the Windward Islands from 1930 to 1935. He was awarded KBE in 1926  and KCMG in 1932.

He married Lady Helena Leopoldine Montagu, the daughter of Rear-Admiral Hon. Victor Alexander Montagu.

References

1870 births
1941 deaths
Governors of the Windward Islands
British colonial governors and administrators in Europe
British colonial governors and administrators in the Americas
Knights Commander of the Order of St Michael and St George
Knights Commander of the Order of the British Empire